UASK may refer to:

 Oskemen Airport